This is a list of lighthouses in Brazil. They are located along the Atlantic coastline and islands of Brazil. These are named landfall lights, or those with a range of over twenty-five nautical miles.

Lighthouses

See also
 Lists of lighthouses and lightvessels

References

External links

 Faróis da Costa Cearense Capitania dos Portos do Ceará, Marinha do Brasil. Retrieved 8 June 2017
 

Brazil
Lighthouse
Lighthouses